Peter Capaldi is a Scottish actor, director and writer. He portrayed the twelfth incarnation of the Doctor in Doctor Who (2013–2017) and Malcolm Tucker in The Thick of It (2005–2012), for which he received four British Academy Television Award nominations, winning Best Male Comedy Performance in 2010. When he reprised the role of Tucker in the feature film In the Loop, Capaldi was honoured with several film critic award nominations for Best Supporting Actor.

Capaldi won the Academy Award for Best Live Action Short Film and the BAFTA Award for Best Short Film for his 1993 short film Franz Kafka's It's a Wonderful Life. He went on to write and direct the drama film Strictly Sinatra and directed two series of the sitcom Getting On. Capaldi also played Mr Curry in the family film Paddington (2014) and its sequel Paddington 2 (2017), voiced Rabbit in the Disney film Christopher Robin (2018) and portrayed supervillain The Thinker in the DC Extended Universe film The Suicide Squad (2021).

Film

Television

Stage

Radio

Video games

Music videos

References

External links
Peter Capaldi at the Internet Movie Database

Male actor filmographies
British filmographies